Fishovo is a rural locality (a village) in Pokrovskoye Rural Settlement, Chagodoshchensky District, Vologda Oblast, Russia. The population was 24 as of 2002.

Geography 
Zubovo is the nearest rural locality.

References 

Rural localities in Chagodoshchensky District